Lady Knight is the fourth book in the  Protector of the Small quartet by Tamora Pierce. This book is Kel's first appearance as a Knight of the Realm.

Plot summary

War with the neighboring country of Scanra is declared at last, and Kel finds herself in charge of a refugee camp. Her district commander, Lord Wyldon, has chosen not to place her in control of a border post or a portion of the army like the other knights, so she's certain that he wishes to keep her—who, as a woman, he views as inferior in combat to males—out of fighting. However, it is revealed that she was chosen for her post because she is the only knight Wyldon knows who wouldn't discriminate against those not of noble blood. Kel soon comes to realize that these refugees, torn from their homes, robbed of their wealth and self-respect, are her responsibility. She must feed them, house them, and keep them safe from harm far too close to the Scanran border. She is able to be a hero, even outside of the battlefield.

In her work at the camp Kel names Haven, she receives help in the shape of her old friends Neal and Merric, the horses Peachblossom and Hoshi, the dog Jump, and her personal sparrow flock, as well as from a mixed myriad group of others: the Wildmage Daine; Daine's lover, the great mage Numair Salmalin; Neal's own father, Duke Baird of Queenscove; Kel's former knight-master Raoul of Goldenlake and Malorie's Peak; men of the King's Own (including Kel's friend and Neal's cousin Sergeant Domitan of Masbolle); convict soldiers who have been given the choice to fight in the army or to die at hard labor; several hundred disillusioned refugees who have received too many empty promises from nobles; smugglers; and a young, orphaned boy with wild magic for horses named Tobe.

While Kel struggles with her responsibilities and the urge simply to abandon the camp and find a real fight, another obligation hangs over her. Before the war began, she was given a task by the Chamber of the Ordeal: to find and destroy the mage whose necromancy creates the giant, swift-moving, deadly metallic machines from the souls of children, known to the Tortallans as "killing devices." But, tied to the camp, she cannot pursue it. However, as the summer wears on and the war intensifies, events move to put that perverted mage and his conscienceless war-leader in Kel's path, and at last her resolve is tested, and she and all of Tortall find out if she is truly worthy of her shield.

After months of hard work with the refugees, Kel feels that they can sufficiently take care of the camp while she is gone for several days to deliver a requested oral report to Lord Wyldon. However, when Tobe is brought into the fort, tired from a long trek from Kel's refugee camp, she knows that something is wrong. The Scanrans have captured her people, and Kel believes that the children will be used to create the horrible metal killing devices terrorizing Tortall. Worse, Lord Wyldon forbids her to go after them. She is left with a choice: obey Wyldon's orders and leave her people for the killing devices, or go after them and presumably be declared a traitor.

After burying the few dead at Haven, Kel tricks her guards into returning to Lord Wyldon without her, and begins what she believes will be a long and harrowing journey into enemy territory. Much to her surprise and dismay, she is soon joined by Neal, several of her other year-mates, Owen, Tobe, and members of the King's Own. They follow the path of the kidnapped refugees across the deadly Vassa river and into Scanra. A series of altercations result in the Scanran guards being depleted, and the rescue of the adult refugees and convict guards of Haven. Continuing to track the kidnapped children, they are led to Fief Rathhausak, and a final battle between the Tortallans and the Scanrans leaves Blayce dead, and the people of Rathhausak free from his tyranny.

The Tortallans and villagers of Rathhausak return across the border to Tortall. In recompense for disobeying orders, she is ordered to build and command a new refugee camp, known as New Hope.

Errata
There is a minor continuity error between Lady Knight and Lioness Rampant, the fourth book in the earlier Song of the Lioness quartet, concerning the Chamber of the Ordeal. In Chapter One of Lady Knight ("Storm Warnings"), Kel's former knight master Raoul of Goldenlake tells her that no one has been allowed back inside the Chamber a second time in all of history. This conflicts with events in Chapter 8 of Lioness Rampant ("Crossroads in Time"), in which Jonathan of Conté enters the Chamber a second time for the Ordeal of Kings—his first experience being his Ordeal of Knighthood.

References

2002 American novels
2002 fantasy novels
Tortallan books